Yeokchon Station is a railway station on Line 6 of the Seoul Subway. It is part of a one-way section of Line 6 known as the Eungam Loop.

Station layout

Exits
 Exit 3 : Eunpyeong District Office
 Exit 4 : Eunpyeong Post Office

References 

Metro stations in Eunpyeong District
Seoul Metropolitan Subway stations
Railway stations opened in 2000